The  was a DC electric locomotive operated by Japanese National Railways (JNR) between 1958 and 1986. It was the first "second-generation" DC electric locomotive type featuring increased-power traction motors. Despite its diminutive size, the Bo-Bo wheel arrangement ED60 design offered performance comparable with the much larger Class EF15 1Co+Co1 design weighing almost twice as much.

Eight locomotives were built between 1958 and 1960 by Kawasaki, Kisha Seizō with Tōyō electrical components, and Mitsubishi. They were introduced on local freight services on the Ōito, Senzan, and Hanwa Lines, replacing earlier ED21, ED22, and ED38 class locomotives acquired when private railways had been absorbed into JNR. The class survived until early 1986 when freight was discontinued on these lines. ED60 1 is preserved at Nagano Depot.

Build details

See also
 Japan Railways locomotive numbering and classification

References

External links

Electric locomotives of Japan
Bo-Bo locomotives
Kawasaki locomotives
1067 mm gauge locomotives of Japan
Preserved electric locomotives
Railway locomotives introduced in 1958